The 1983 season of the Venezuelan Primera División, the top category of Venezuelan football, was played by 10 teams. The national champions were Universidad de Los Andes.

Results

Standings

External links
Venezuela 1983 season at RSSSF

Ven
Venezuelan Primera División seasons
Prim